Dayal Padmanabhan is a noted Indian film writer, director and producer, mainly working in Kannada cinema who is a two times Karnataka State award winner. Most of his films are experimental in the genre of Rom-Com and Thriller.

His most notable films are Baa Baro Rasika (2004), Yeshwanth (2005), Circus (2009), Haggada Kone (2014), Actor (2015), Aa Karaala Ratri (2018), Ranganayaki (2019). His first film as a director was OK Saar OK. He starred in Gaalipata, where his Dracula character received critical and public acclaim. His film Haggada Kone and Aa Karaala Ratri received widespread critical acclaim and he won Karnataka State awards for the those films under Best Director & Best Film Category in the year 2014 & 2018 respectively. DayalPadmanabhan competed in the television show Bigg Boss House for Bigg Boss Kannada Season 5, and was eliminated on his 21st day. His next Kannada movie is Ombattane Dikku starring "Loose Mada" Yogi. In 2020, Dayal, has ventured into tollywood with "Anaganaga O Athidi", a remake of his own directorial cult hit Aa Karaala Ratri.

Personal life 

Dayal Padmanabhan hails from Villupuram town of Tamil Nadu. His parents were Radha and Padmanabhan. His father had worked in Tamil Nadu electricity board. He completed his Diploma in Civil Engineering from Muthiah polytechnic, Chidambaram. Later he finished his B.E from the B.M.S. College of Engineering, Bangalore. He worked for 15 years in Indian Institute of Science (1988 to 2002). He is married and has two children.

Film career

As a Writer 

Dayal Padmanabhan entered the Kannada industry as a writer in the year 2000. His first movie as a writer was Om Ganesh starring "Dialogue King" Sai Kumar and directed by Thriller Manju. He went on to write for many films including Hudugigage,H2O,Gattimela. He has written the story, Screenplay & Dialogues for most his movies. He is also known for adopting Kannada plays and Novels to make as films. While his film Haggada Kone and Aa karala Ratri are based on Kannada plays written by Parvathavani and Mohan Habbu respectively. Ranganayaki was based on his own Kannada short Novel. He was one of the nominees' by the Times of India Film Awards 2011 for the best screenplay writer for his film Yogaraj.

As a Director 
He directed his first film OK saar OK in 2003 and went on to direct ten more Kannada films including the hits like Baa Baaro Rasika,Circus ,Masala, Sri Harikathe and 'Haggadha Kone'. His another film was Circus starring Ganesh.
He has also starred in Gaalipata where he played a mute character called "Dracula". His movie "Haggada kone" released to rave reviews. His last release was a rom-com titled Satya Harishchandra. He ventured into commercial filmmaking zone after a long time with this movie. Sharan is played the lead in the movie. His latest release was the critically and commercially successful Aa Karaala Ratri starring Jayaram Karthik and Anupama Gowda. The two completed films are Tryambakam and Ranganayaki. The film is which was supposed to be released in June 2020, has been delayed due to the pandemic. Dayal then moved on to his debut Telugu directorial, "Anaganaga O Athithi, a remake of his 2018 hit Aa Karala Ratri. The Telugu version was a straight to OTT release and was premiered in AHA ott platform.

As a Producer 
He also turned to production with this film where he was the executive producer. He has also produced Circus and Co produced Shriharikathe under his own production house D Pictures. He is the Producer for the under production project Ondu Rupayalli Eradu Preethi.  He is the producer for the films Circus and Yogaraj. He Co-produced the film Shriharikathe,. All the above projects were executed under his own production house D Pictures.

He believes the turning point of his film career came with the movie Gaalipata. His movie Yogaraj But,starring Naveena Krishna & Neethu which released mid-2011. The movie released to positive critical response in Rediff, IBN,ChitralokaA,Times of India and others, with critics rating the movie 3 to 4 stars. After the reception, Dayal boldly quoted " Once again i have made a movie that was appreciated but not a hit".
Dayal padmanabhan also worked as an executive producer for the Tamil movie Brahman starring Sasikumar.

As a Distributor 

On 14 January Dayal announced that he is foraying into distribution with the Kannada film "RANKAL RAATE" through his company D+ Distributors.

Role in Karnataka film industry bodies 
On 26 September 2011, Dayal won in the Karnataka Film Chamber of Commerce election as a member of Producer Sector. Dayal Padmanabhan won the election purely on the reputation he had earned as a general member in the KFCC working body.

Controversies

Film Awards
Dayal filed a petition against a prestigious film award for not nominating his film even after it had received widespread critical acclaim. His petition was accepted by Bangalore City civil court and the organizers/Jury were ordered to add nominations for his movie on four different categories, Best Actor (Male), Best Director, Best Film, Best Supporting Actor (male).

Petition Against Multiplexes

The Karnataka state budget 2016 - 2017 was scheduled to be proposed on 18 March. Ahead of this major event Dayal padmanabhan started a petition requesting the state government to cap the movie ticket prices to 120 Rs at multiplexes in the state.

He explained his intentions behind this petition."Multiplexes in Karnataka price the ticket based on the demand and profit margins. This reduces the occupancy rate. On an average, a cinema hall records only 46% occupancy even for a high profile film as the price is set at a higher range (It can go up to 800 INR). My idea is to reduce the pricing and increase the occupancy. More the patrons, more the patronage. Only this can make the industry healthier."

His Petition went viral and was signed by thousands of people across karnataka.

Complaint against Anup Sa Ra Govind

Dayal Padmanabhan, who is an active producer-director, had pointed out flaws in the 2019 elections at the Karnataka Film Chamber of Commerce. He contested on the appointment of Anuup Sara Govindu as a member and says it breaks the rules. He wrote a complaint letter to the District Registrar of Societies. Dayal argued that Mr. Anup Gowda failed to meet the eligibility to even contest in the elections as per the bylaws of KFCC.

Petition Against National Film awards

Dayal Padmanabhan filed a petition with the Karnataka high court against the National Film awards stating that one of the members of the jury was affiliated to film nominated for the awards and, as per regulations, a jury member or chairman should not be associated in any manner to the films submitted for awards.

Filmography

Awards

References

Kannada screenwriters
Kannada film directors
People from Viluppuram district
Living people
1970 births
Kannada film producers
Film producers from Tamil Nadu
Bigg Boss Kannada contestants